Serlin may refer to:

Serlin Spur, Marie Byrd Land, Antarctica
Edward Serlin House, a house in Pleasantville, New York, United States

Persons with the surname Serlin
Joey Serlin (born 1970), Canadian rock guitarist and songwriter
Joseph Serlin (1868-1944), French politician
Oscar Serlin (1901-1971), American Broadway producer
Yosef Serlin (1906-1974), Israeli politician